This article lists those who were potential candidates for the Democratic nomination for Vice President of the United States in the 1976 election. Former Georgia Governor Jimmy Carter won the 1976 Democratic nomination for President of the United States, and chose Minnesota Senator Walter Mondale as his running mate. According to Joel Goldstein, a legal professor and the author of several works on the vice presidency, 1976 marked the beginning of the modern vice presidential selection process, with candidates undergoing extensive vetting. Carter thought that the vice president could be an important asset for a president, and Mondale became a major part of Carter's campaign. The choice of Mondale helped Carter, a Southern "outsider" with little experience in Washington, rally the Democratic base to his candidacy. The Carter–Mondale ticket defeated the Ford–Dole ticket in the 1976 election.

Potential running mates

Nominee

Finalists

Others

See also
Jimmy Carter 1976 presidential campaign
1976 Democratic Party presidential primaries
1976 Democratic National Convention
1976 United States presidential election
List of United States major party presidential tickets

References

Vice presidency of the United States
1976 United States presidential election
Walter Mondale